Aporrhais serresiana is a species of medium-sized sea snail, a marine gastropod mollusk in the family Aporrhaidae, the pelican's foot snails or pelican's foot shells.

Description

Distribution

References

 Nordsieck F. (1968). Die europäischen Meeres-Gehäuseschnecken (Prosobranchia). Vom Eismeer bis Kapverden und Mittelmeer. Gustav Fischer, Stuttgart VIII + 273 pp:
 Gofas, S.; Le Renard, J.; Bouchet, P. (2001). Mollusca. in: Costello, M.J. et al. (eds), European Register of Marine Species: a check-list of the marine species in Europe and a bibliography of guides to their identification. Patrimoines Naturels. 50: 180-213.

External links
 Michaud [A.L.G.] (1828). Description de plusieurs espèces de coquilles vivantes de la Méditerranée. Bulletin d'Histoire Naturelle de la Société Linnéenne de Bordeaux, 2(10): 119-122, 1 plate (unnumbered) 
 Jeffreys J.G. (1862-1869). British conchology. Vol. 1: pp. cxiv + 341 [1862]. Vol. 2: pp. 479 [1864]. Vol. 3: pp. 394 [1865]. Vol. 4: pp. 487 [1867]. Vol. 5: pp. 259 [1869]. London, van Voorst
 Locard A. (1891). Contributions à la faune malacologique française XVI. Les coquilles marines vivantes de la faune française décrites par G. Michaud. Études critiques d'après les types de ses collections. Annales de la Société d'Agriculture, Histoire Naturelle et Arts utiles de Lyon. (6) 3 [1890]: 93-134
 Gofas, S.; Luque, Á. A.; Templado, J.; Salas, C. (2017). A national checklist of marine Mollusca in Spanish waters. Scientia Marina. 81(2) : 241-254, and supplementary online material.

Aporrhaidae
Gastropods described in 1828